The 2017 Pan American Individual Event Artistic Gymnastics Championships was held in Lima, Peru, August 10–12, 2017. The competition was organized by the Peruvian Gymnastics Federation and approved by the International Gymnastics Federation.

Medal summary

Senior medalists

Medal table

References

2017 in gymnastics
Pan American Gymnastics Championships
International gymnastics competitions hosted by Peru